Ivybridge Town Football Club is an amateur football club based in Ivybridge, Devon, England.

History
The club was established in 1925 and joined the Plymouth & District League in 1926. They later became members of the Plymouth & District Combination, which was formed by the league's merger with the Plymouth Combination League.

In 1992 Ivybridge were founder members of the Devon County League, joining from the Plymouth & District Combination. They finished bottom of the league in 1994–95 and again in 1997–98. However, a gradual improvement in performances saw them end the 2002–03 season as league runners-up. They were runners-up again the following season, also winning the league's Charity Cup. They won the Devon Premier Cup in 2004–05, and retained it the following season, in which they were also Devon County League champions. In 2007 the Devon County League merged with the South Western League to form the South West Peninsula League, with Ivybridge placed in the Premier Division.

Following league reorganisation at the end of the 2018–19 season, Ivybridge were placed in the Premier Division East.

Club staff
President: Peter Kingwell
Chairman: David Graddon
Vice-Chairman: Trevor Parsons
Club secretary: Paul Cocks
General manager & Club Treasurer: Brian Howard
First-team manager: Darren Stewart
Match Day Assistant: Mark Mills

Honours
Devon County League
Champions 2005–06
Charity Shield winners 2003–04
Devon Premier Cup
 Winners 2004–05, 2005–06
Throgmorton Cup
Winners 2000–01, 2002–03

Records
Best FA Vase performance: Second qualifying round, 2015–16

See also
Ivybridge Town F.C. players
Ivybridge Town F.C. managers

References

External links
Official website

 
Football clubs in Devon
Football clubs in England
Association football clubs established in 1925
1925 establishments in England
Devon County League
South West Peninsula League
Ivybridge